The sixth season of Dynasty originally aired in the United States on ABC from September 25, 1985 through May 21, 1986. The series, created by Richard and Esther Shapiro and produced by Aaron Spelling, revolves around the Carringtons, a wealthy family residing in Denver, Colorado.

Season six stars John Forsythe as millionaire oil magnate Blake Carrington; Linda Evans as his wife Krystle; Jack Coleman as Blake and Alexis's earnest son Steven; Gordon Thomson as Blake and Alexis's eldest son Adam; Pamela Bellwood as Steven's ex-wife, Claudia; Heather Locklear as Krystle's niece and Steven's ex-wife Sammy Jo; Michael Nader as Alexis's husband Dex Dexter; Catherine Oxenberg as Blake and Alexis's youngest daughter, Amanda; Michael Praed as Amanda's husband Prince Michael of Moldavia; Diahann Carroll as Blake's half-sister Dominique Deveraux; Ted McGinley as Clay Fallmont; and Joan Collins as Alexis Colby, Blake's ex-wife and the mother of Adam, Fallon, Steven, and Amanda. The season also features Maxwell Caulfield as Jeff's cousin, Miles Colby; Christopher Cazenove as Blake's brother, Ben Carrington; Kate O'Mara as Alexis' sister Caress Morell; and George Hamilton as con man Joel Abrigore.

A spin-off series, The Colbys, was launched in November 1985, starring John James and Emma Samms as their Dynasty characters, Jeff Colby and Fallon Carrington. To set up the new series, Dynasty introduced the series regulars of The Colbys, including Charlton Heston as wealthy Colby Enterprises CEO Jason Colby; Stephanie Beacham as his wife Sable; Tracy Scoggins as their daughter Monica, twin sister to Miles; Claire Yarlett as Bliss Colby; Jason and Sable's youngest daughter; Barbara Stanwyck as Jason's sister Constance Colby; and Ricardo Montalbán as shipping tycoon Zach Powers.

Development
The season six premiere episode "The Aftermath" garnered a 28.1 rating, higher than any other episode in the entire series, as viewers wanted to see who survived the "Moldavian Massacre" cliffhanger from the season five finale. The only casualties were Steven's boyfriend Luke Fuller (William Campbell), and Jeff's love interest Lady Ashley Mitchell (Ali MacGraw). In the 2006 CBS special Dynasty Reunion: Catfights & Caviar, Gordon Thomson stated that it was the "follow-up" that was the letdown, not the cliffhanger itself. John James stated in the 2001 episode of E! The True Hollywood Story featuring Dynasty that the Moldavian Massacre was when the show "maxed out" and "overdosed" on outrageousness. Joan Collins was conspicuously absent from the season six opener, as she was in a tense contract renegotiation with the show, seeking an increased salary. She returned to the series in the season's second episode.

Although still a top ten series, Dynasty dropped from first to seventh place in the ratings for its sixth season. A spin-off series, The Colbys, was launched in November 1985, starring John James and Emma Samms as their Dynasty characters, Jeff Colby and Fallon Carrington.

Plot
Spurned by Blake, Alexis finds his estranged brother Ben and the duo successfully plot to strip Blake of his fortune. Alexis's sister Caress Morell also appears and causes trouble for Alexis. Steven's budding relationship with the closeted Bart Fallmont (Kevin Conroy) is ruined by Adam's business-motivated public revelation that Bart is gay. Krystle is held hostage and replaced by lookalike Rita (also played by Evans), who is working with a con man to rob Blake. Amanda, who has divorced Prince Michael, fights with Sammy Jo for the favors of Clay Fallmont. The May 21, 1986 season finale finds Blake strangling Alexis while the rest of the cast is in peril at the La Mirage hotel, which has been accidentally set afire by Claudia.

Cast

Main

 John Forsythe as Blake Carrington
 Linda Evans as Krystle Carrington
 John James as Jeff Colby
 Pamela Bellwood as Claudia Blaisdel
Gordon Thomson as Adam Carrington
Jack Coleman as Steven Carrington
Michael Nader as Dex Dexter
Catherine Oxenberg as Amanda Carrington
Michael Praed as Prince Michael of Moldavia
Emma Samms as Fallon Carrington Colby
Heather Locklear as Sammy Jo Carrington
Maxwell Caulfield as Miles Colby
George Hamilton as Joel Abrigore
 Ted McGinley as Clay Fallmont
 Christopher Cazenove as Ben Carrington
 Kate O'Mara as Caress Morell
Ken Howard as Garrett Boydston
Diahann Carroll as Dominique Deveraux
Ricardo Montalbán as Zach Powers
Joan Collins as Alexis Carrington
Special appearance by
 Charlton Heston as Jason Colby
 Barbara Stanwyck as Constance Colby
 Stephanie Beacham as Sable Colby
 Tracy Scoggins as Monica Colby
 Claire Yarlett as Bliss Colby

Recurring

William Beckley as Gerard
Joel Fabiani as King Galen of Moldavia
Troy Beyer as Jackie Deveraux
Kevin Conroy as Bart Fallmont
Calvin Lockhart as Jonathan Lake
Kerry Armstrong as Elena, Duchess of Branagh
Patricia Crowley as Emily Fallmont
Virginia Hawkins as Jeanette Robbins
Betty Harford as Hilda Gunnerson
Theodore Bikel as Warnick
Richard Anderson as Buck Fallmont

Notable guest stars

James Sutorious as Gordon Wales
Anthony Zerbe as Crenshaw
Soon Tek-Oh as Kai Liu
Kabir Bedi as Farouk Ahmed
William Campbell as Luke Fuller
Hank Brandt as Morgan Hess

Cast notes

Episodes 

The Colbys was spun off Dynasty during season six.

Reception
In season six, Dynasty was ranked #7 in the United States with a 21.8 Nielsen rating.

References

External links 
 

1985 American television seasons
1986 American television seasons
Dynasty (1981 TV series) seasons